Ruuth is a Finnish surname. Notable people with the surname include:

Ilari Ruuth (born 1990), Finnish footballer
Erik Ruuth (1746–1820), owner of Marsvinsholm Castle
Risto Ruuth, Finnish musician formerly of Eternal Tears of Sorrow

Finnish-language surnames